Purushanda (also variously Puruskhanda, Purushhattum,Purushhatum or Burushattum) was an Anatolian kingdom of the early second millennium prior to the common era. It was conquered by the Hittites sometime between 1650–1556 BCE.

Etymology

The name is written as māt Purušḫattim in the oldest Assyrian texts, 
and it has been speculated that the root Puruš- is of Indo-European (i.e. Luwian language) heritage. The suffix -ḫattim most certainly refers to the Hattians. It was transliterated as Pu-ru-us-ha-an-da in the oldest Hittite texts (1650 -1500 BCE) and Pu-u-ru-us-ha-an-da (or -ta) in the newer ones (13th century BCE), resulting in the modern spelling Purušhanda. The allophone variation of P/B is from the Akkadian language, which variously transliterated the name as Puruš-haddum, Puruš-ḫattim, Buruš-haddum, Puruš-hadim and Puruš-handar.

Location

Purushanda has yet to be archaeologically located. It can be discerned as a polity in the general central Anatolian region from Old Assyrian texts, appeared to have access to the silver mines of the Taurus Mountains and control of the Cilician Gates. It has been posited as lying astride an inland passage of Anatolia known as “the Great Caravan Route” during the Early Bronze age, connecting Cilicia with the Troad. Scholarship has reduced its location to three likely sites. Majority opinion locates it at the mound of Acemhöyük. The site consists of a 700 by 600 meter mound, shows occupation back to the third millennium BCE with central Anatolian, Mesopotamian and North Syrian pottery of the same era, a lower city that existed only during the Old Assyrian period, a burnt level at the end of that period and contemporaneous abandonment. Minority views hold it to be at either the mound of Karahöyük or somewhere west of Konya in the land of Pedassa.

History

The city is first mentioned toward the end of the 19th century BCE in the records of  Mari. Subsequent seals found in Purušhanda suggest substantial trade between the two kingdoms as well as the possibility of dynastic intermarriage between the two royal houses. The city is prominently mentioned in the Anitta Texts, a collection of Hittite writings unearthed at Kanesh. They depict it as a major seat of power in the region, describing its ruler as "Great King" (rubā'um rabi'um) whereas other rulers are merely "kings". A separate text known as the "King of Battle" (šar tamhāri), dating to the 14th century BC, recounts a heavily embellished account of the Akkadian king Sargon carrying out an expedition against Purushanda's ruler Nur-Dagan (or Nur-Daggal). The story is ahistorical, as it apparently portrays the 23rd-century Sargon in an anachronistic 19th-century BC setting. Some modern scholars consider it a work of fiction, although the Akkadian language version was also found among the Amarna letters (Egypt), and it may have some basis in historical fact.
In the story, Sargon yearns for battle but is advised against it by his generals. Nonetheless, when a message arrives from a group of Akkadian merchants in Purushanda pleading for help from Sargon against the oppressive Nur-Dagan, the king mobilises his army and marches off through difficult terrain. Nur-Dagan is hopeful that flooding and the terrain will thwart Sargon, but the Akkadian launches a lightning attack which captures Purushanda. Nur-Dagan is taken prisoner and grovels before Sargon, declaring him to be a peerless mighty king and perhaps swearing allegiance as a vassal. After three years the Akkadians leave, taking with them the fruits of the land as spoils of war.

Purushanda features again in the stories of the campaigns of the 17th century BC Hittite ruler Anitta. The Purushandan kingdom appears to have been a significant rival of Kanesh, the kingdom ruled by Anitta. The Hittite king launched a war against Purushanda but according to the Anitta Text, a Hittite account of later date, the Purushandan king surrendered to the Hittite army:

When I went into battle, the Man of Purushanda brought gifts to me; he brought to me a throne of iron and a sceptre of iron as a gift. But when I returned to Nesa [Kanesh] I took the Man of Purushanda with me. As soon as he enters the chamber, that man will sit before me on the right.

The text indicates that the right to rule over Purushanda's territory – symbolised by the regalia of office, the throne and sceptre – was surrendered to Anitta. Its king was reduced to the status of a privileged vassal, entitled to join Anitta at the court in Kanesh in recognition of his voluntary surrender and his high-born status. The kingdom itself probably ceased to exist at this point and was absorbed into Hittite-ruled territory.

Kings
 Nur-daggal (legendary king, contemporary with Sargon of Akkad)

References

Former populated places in Turkey
Hittite cities
History of Aksaray Province